The Macoustigane River is a tributary of the east bank of the Wetetnagami River flowing into Senneterre in the RCM of La Vallée-de-l'Or Regional County Municipality, in the administrative region of Abitibi-Témiscamingue, in Quebec, in Canada.

This river successively crosses the townships of Charette and Adhémar.

Forestry is the main economic activity of the sector; recreational tourism, second, particularly thanks to the Lake Wetetnagami Biodiversity Reserve. The Macoustigane River Valley is served by the forest road (east-west) passing south of Wetetnagami Lake in the Wetetnagami Lake Biodiversity Reserve.

The surface of the Macoustigane River is usually frozen from early November to mid-May, however, safe ice movement is generally from mid-November to mid-April.

Geography

Toponymy 
At different times in history, this territory has been occupied by the Attikameks, Algonquins and Cree. Of Native origin of the Algonquin nation, the term "Macoustigane" means "head of the bear".

The toponym "Rivière Macoustigane" was made official on December 5, 1968, at the Commission de toponymie du Québec, when it was created.

See also

References

External links 

Rivers of Abitibi-Témiscamingue
Nottaway River drainage basin